Shonar Beri (also known in English as Chains of Gold) is a 1987 Bengali documentary film. It was written and directed by Tareque Masud, and was his directorial debut. The film was also the first video documentary and was an early attempt at dealing with gender issues in Bangladesh. It deals with the oppressed condition of women in Bangladesh. It portrayals everyday subordination of women under the Islamic regulation in Bangladeshi society.

References

Sources

External links

1987 films
Bengali-language Bangladeshi films
Short films directed by Tareque Masud
Documentary films about Islam
Films about social issues
Gender in film